Deopara Union is a union of Ghatail Upazila, Tangail District, Bangladesh. It is situated 10 km southeast of Ghatail and 31 km northeast of Tangail, The District Headquarter.

Demographics

According to Population Census 2011 performed by Bangladesh Bureau of Statistics, The total population of Deopara union is 23700. There are  households 6042 in total.

Education

The literacy rate of Deopara Union is 39.6% (Male-43.8%, Female-35.8%).

See also
 Union Councils of Tangail District

References

Populated places in Dhaka Division
Populated places in Tangail District
Unions of Ghatail Upazila